Downhill Challenge is a skiing video game developed by Microïds. It was published 1988 in the US by Broderbund and in France by Loriciel as Super Ski. In the UK it had an Eddie the Eagle license. The third-person, 2.5D game has 4 modes: Downhill, Slalom, Giant Slalom and Ski Jump. It can be played up to 5 players taking turns with their results compared at the end.

See also
 List of Microids games

External links
Microïds Official website

1988 video games
Amiga games
Amstrad CPC games
Apple IIGS games
Atari ST games
Broderbund games
Commodore 64 games
DOS games
Microïds games
Single-player video games
Skiing video games
Video games developed in France
Virtual Studio games
ZX Spectrum games